Azhiniyaz Kosybay Uly (1824–1878) was a Karakalpak poet, who is also known by his pen name Ziywar.

Origins 
Ájiniyaz was born in 1824 at the southern coast of the Aral Sea, in the village of Qamısh buǵat of the Muynak District, at the mouth of the river Amu Darya, where the Karakalpak tribes as ashamayli and kiyat used to live. Ájiniyaz’s father Qosıbay, his brothers Baltabek and Aqjigit were the brave men of their time. His mother Nazira was an eloquent and charming lady.

Education 
Since his childhood, Ajiniyaz had been interested in academia. He first attended the madrasa of Khojamurad-imam, then, after his mother’s death, took classes from his uncle Elmurad. Apart from attending classes, the future poet was engaged in rewriting books, which made him well-known. By the age of 16 he had rewritten some poems by Alisher Navoi.
Ajiniyaz continued his education in Khiva. In the cultural center of ancient Khorezm he attended first the madrasa of Sher-Gozi where the classic Turkmen poet Maktumkuli had studied before, and then joined the madrasa of Kutlimurat-Inak. Today, at the entrance of this madrasa, one can see written: “Here in 1840-1845 a poet Ájiniyaz Qosıbay Ulı used to study.” 
In addition to spiritual disciplines, Ajiniyaz studied the poetry of Oriental classical poets such as Navoi, Khafiz, Saadi, and Fizuli in the madrasa of Kutlimurat-Inak, which greatly influenced his progressive lyric poetry.

After graduation from the madrasa of Kutlimurat-Inak, Ajiniyaz returned to his native village but soon left again for Kazakhstan, where he remained for a year. Upon his return, he married a girl named Khamra from the tribe Ashmayli, who bore two sons and a daughter for him. His descendants presently live in the Kungrad, Qonliko’l, Shumanay regions, and in the city of Nukus.

The Kungrad rebellion 
The Kungrad rebellion of 1858−1859, one of the important events in the history of the people inhabiting the Khorezm oasis, had a large influence on the poetic nature of Ajiniyaz. A patriot and scholar, he could not remain indifferent to this event, instead choosing to take an active part in it. He was subsequently deported to Turkmenistan by the authorities of Khiva as one of the leaders of the rebellion. During the deportation period the poet translated into Karakalpak many poems by Maktumkuli.

Life in Kazakhstan 
Three years later Ajiniyaz came back home where he was persecuted. Under these circumstances he left for Kazakhstan. It is considered that it was in 1864 during his trip to Kazakhstan that he takes part in aytis, a lyrical competition with a Kazakh poet called Kiz-Menesh. Compared with other contemporary folk genres of the region, aytis was particularly popular. In 1878 it was described in the Tashkent newspaper Turkistan walayati.
According to the contents of one of Ajiniyaz’s poems he was 40 years old at that time:  
      ... When there is wedding, you’ll wear red chapan, 
      And burn from love in the fire of your beloved. 
      I was born in a year of a sheep, now I am 40, Kiz-menesh, 
      Will you marry me, clarifying the age! 
The years spent in Kazakhstan refer to the golden age of the poetic activity of Ajiniyaz. At this period he created a big number of his famous poems.
Coming back to his native place Ajiniyaz opens schools in the villages «Bozataw», «Kamis buget», «Jetim uzak» for the children from poor families where he teaches them skills of grammar. Besides, till the end of his life – the poet died in 1874 − he keeps writing poems.

Bozataw tragedy 
Ajiniyaz was not only one of the ideologists of the people’s rebellion but also an active participant of the Bozataw tragedy which like a serious injury had left an awful scar in the history and in minds of the Karakalpak people. The hard trial suffered by the native people bore Ajiniyaz’s  famous poem Bozataw: 
      Century of Land with nation, nation is with land, 
      Grief is awaiting us, landless in exile.
      We won’t forget the pain, tribe will disappear 
      You were our bread-winner, dear Bozataw.
 
      Heard, firing started out before sunrise, 
      Slept as free before-woke up as a slaver, 
      Hands were tied up-where is the struggle…
      Your son was captured suddenly, Bozataw.

Honours 
Nukus State Pedagogical Institute named in the honour of Ajiniyaz.
A monument of Ajiniyaz holding karakalpak national instrument "dutar" is established in Nukus, Uzbekistan, by Savitsky Museum

References

External links
 Ethnographic words in the works of poet-classic Ajiniyaz at East European Science Journal

1824 births
1878 deaths
People from Karakalpakstan
Uzbekistani male poets
19th-century Uzbekistani poets
19th-century male writers